The United States of America (USA) has sent athletes to every celebration of the  Pan American Games. The United States Olympic & Paralympic Committee (USOPC) is the National Olympic Committee for the United States.

American athletes have won a total of 4696/4759 medals at the Pan American Games and another 11 at the Pan American Winter Games (which have been staged only once).

Hosted Games
The United States has hosted the Pan American Games on two occasions:

Medal tables

Medals by Summer Games

Medals by Winter Games

Medals by summer sport
As of the conclusion of the 2019 Pan American Games

Medals by winter sport

See also
United States at the Parapan American Games
United States at the team sports international competitions

References